The Enterovirus 5′ cloverleaf cis-acting replication element is an RNA element found in the 5′ UTR of Enterovirus genomes. The element has a cloverleaf like secondary structure and is known to be a multifunctional cis-acting replication element (CRE), required for the initiation of negative strand RNA synthesis.

See also 
Enteroviral 3′ UTR element
Enterovirus cis-acting replication element

References

External links 
 

Cis-regulatory RNA elements
Enteroviruses